Rubin James Colwill (born 27 April 2002) is a Welsh professional footballer who plays as a winger for Welsh club Cardiff City and the Wales national team.

Club career
Colwill joined the youth academy of Cardiff City when he was eight. He made his professional debut with the club as a late substitute during a 3–1 EFL Championship win over Coventry City on 13 February 2021. The following day, Colwill signed his first professional contract, alongside Isaak Davies. Colwill's first league start for the club came in a 2–1 win over Wycombe Wanderers on 24 April 2021, earning high praise from manager Mick McCarthy for his performance in the match.  On 12 September 2021, Colwill scored his first senior goals, scoring a brace in Cardiff's 2-1 victory against Nottingham Forest. On 6 February 2022, he scored Cardiff's only goal in a 3-1 loss to Liverpool in the FA Cup Fourth Round.

International career
Colwill made his debut for the Wales national under-17 football team in a 2–2 draw against Belarus on 10 October 2018. He was selected for the Wales under-21 squad for a friendly match against Republic of Ireland on 25 March 2021 and made his debut for the side as a substitute during a 2–1 defeat.

On 30 May 2021, despite having never made an appearance for the senior squad, Colwill was selected by Rob Page for Wales' Euro 2020 squad. He made his senior national team debut on 2 June 2021 in a friendly against France, replacing Joe Morrell in the 83rd minute.  Colwill scored his first international goal for Wales on 29 March 2022 in a 1-1 friendly match draw against Czech Republic.

In November 2022 he was named in the Wales squad for the 2022 FIFA World Cup in Qatar. He came in as last substitute for injured Joe Allen, at the 81st minute of the third group game against England.

Career statistics

References

External links
 

2002 births
Living people
Footballers from Neath
Welsh footballers
Wales youth international footballers
Wales under-21 international footballers
Wales international footballers
Association football midfielders
Cardiff City F.C. players
English Football League players
UEFA Euro 2020 players
2022 FIFA World Cup players